Aspasmichthys ciconiae is a species of clingfish found along Pacific coasts from Japan through Taiwan.  This species grows to a length of  SL. The species was described by David Starr Jordan and Henry Weed Fowler in 1902 from types collected from tide pools near Wakayama in Japan.

References

ciconiae
Fish described in 1902
Taxa named by David Starr Jordan